Dil Hi To Hai is a 1992 Bollywood romantic drama film directed by Asrani. It stars Jackie Shroff in dual roles, with Divya Bharti and Shilpa Shirodkar.

Plot

King Vikram Singh (Amjad Khan) rules over a tiny state in India, called Vikramgarh. His sons are the royal twin-brothers Harshvardhan and Govardhan (double role by Jackie Shroff). Harshvardhan is the smarter one of them, hence he is regarded to become the future King of Vikramgarh. The Diwan Thakur Karan Singh (Kader Khan) is his loyal friend who stays at the prince's side all the time to train him for his future duties. Govardhan can have all the liberty he wants, while Harshvardhan has to face his duties and hence cannot enjoy the same freedom. One day, when his marriage to Jayshree (Shilpa Shirodkar) is planned, he decides to make his brother take his place, so Harshvardhan and his Diwan go to Mumbai where Harshvardhan meets Bharati (Divya Bharti) and instantly falls in love and thus becomes the enemy of Jack (Gulshan Grover) who plans on getting Bharati for himself and marry her.

Cast

Jackie Shroff as Prince Harshvardhan / Prince Govardhan (Dual Role)
Divya Bharti as Bharati
Shilpa Shirodkar as Jayshree
Raza Murad as Bharati's Uncle
Gulshan Grover as Jack 
Kader Khan as Diwan Thakur Karan Singh
Amjad Khan as Maharaj Vikram Singh
Anjana Mumtaz as Maharani Kaushalya Singh
Sudhir Pandey as Kammini (Jack's Father)
Ashok Saraf as Lodge's Manager
Anjan Srivastav as Minister
Avtar Gill as Minister's Friend
Kunika as Flower Seller
Sulabha Deshpande as Mausi
Dinesh Hingoo as Raja's Neighbour
Mulraj Rajda as Jayshree's Father
Yunus Parvez as Gold Smith
Vikas Anand as Hotel Manager
Viju Khote as Taxi Driver

Soundtrack
Meri Choodiyan Baje - Lata Mangeshkar
Dil Hi To Hai Aa Gaya - Mohammed Aziz, Alka Yagnik
Ek Ladki Ka Main Deewana - Mukul Agarwal, Sudesh Bhosle
Chhat Ke Upar Do Kabutar - Sagarika Mukherjee, Sonali Bajpai, Manhar Udhas, Sudesh Bhosle
Sahiba O Sahiba - Sudesh Bhosle, Amit Kumar, Alka Yagnik
Main Kya Karoon - Mohammed Aziz
Chhat Ke Upar Do Kabutar (Version 2.3) - Jackie Shroff, Manhar Udhas, Sudesh Bhosle

References

External links
 

1992 films
1990s Hindi-language films
1992 romantic drama films
Films scored by Laxmikant–Pyarelal